Wilkes is a surname of English origin. Its origin is as a variant of the name William. At the time of the British Census of 1881 Wilkes Surname at Forebears, its relative frequency was highest in Staffordshire (9.5 times the British average), followed by Worcestershire, Shropshire, Warwickshire, Flintshire, Gloucestershire, Herefordshire, Montgomeryshire and Anglesey. In all other British counties, its relative frequency was below national average.  The name Wilkes may refer to:

Albert Wilkes (1874–1936), English sports photographer and football (soccer) player
Alice Wilkes, lady in waiting to Queen Katherine Howard
Alexander Wilkes (1900–1937), English cricketer
Belinda Wilkes, English astrophysicist 
Benjamin Wilkes (died c.1749), British entomological painter
Brent A. Wilkes, executive director of the League of United Latin American Citizens
Brent R. Wilkes (born 1954), American defense contractor
Carissa Wilkes (born 1986), New Zealand road cyclist
Cathy Wilkes (born 1966), Northern Ireland artist
Charles Wilkes (1798–1877), American naval officer and explorer
Dave Wilkes (born 1964), English professional football player
Debbi Wilkes (born 1946), Canadian figure skater and author of books on figure skating
Del Wilkes (born 1961), American wrestler
Donald E. Wilkes Jr. (born 1944), American professor of law
Donna Wilkes (born 1959), American film actress 
Faas Wilkes (1923–2006), Dutch football (soccer) player
Frank Wilkes (born 1922), Australian politician
Frederick Wilkes (1869–after 1892), English professional footballer
Fred Wilkes (1883–1942), English professional footballer 
George Wilkes (1817–1885), American journalist and newspaper editor
Ian Wilkes (born 1965), Australian racehorse trainer in the USA
India Wilkes, fictional character in American novel and film Gone with the Wind
J. D. Wilkes (born 1972), American musician
Jamaal Wilkes (born 1953), American basketball player, formerly Keith Wilkes
James Wilkes (disambiguation), several people
Joanne Wilkes (born 1956), New Zealand professor of English literature
John Wilkes (disambiguation), several people
Jon Wilkes (born 1985), American drummer
Jonathan Wilkes (born 1978), English television presenter, actor and musician
Joseph Wilkes (1733–1805), English industrialist and agricultural improver
Justin Wilkes, film producer
Kathy Wilkes (1946–2003), English philosopher and academic
Kris Wilkes (born 1998), American basketball player
Lyall Wilkes (1914–1991), English historian, judge and politician
Mary Allen Wilkes (born 1937), American computer programmer and hardware engineer
Sir Maurice Wilkes (1913–2010), British computer scientist
Maya Wilkes, fictional character in American TV sitcom Girlfriends
Melanie Wilkes, fictional character in American novel and film Gone with the Wind
Sir Michael Wilkes (1940–2013), British army general
Oliver Wilkes (born 1980), English born Scottish rugby league player
Oren Wilkes (born 1988), American fashion model and blogger
Owen Wilkes (1940–2005), New Zealand peace campaigner
Paget Wilkes (1871–1934), English missionary in Japan
Paul Wilkes (born 1938), American author on Catholicism
Peter Singleton Wilkes (1827–1900), American Confederate politician
Reggie Wilkes (born 1956), American football player
Rich Wilkes (born 1966), American filmmaker
Robert Wilkes (1832–1880), Irish-Canadian politician and businessman
Robert Wilkes (priest) (born 1948), Church of England priest, former Dean of Birmingham Cathedral
Rodney Wilkes (1925–2014), Trinidadian weightlifter
Sarah Wilkes (born 1990), Canadian curler 
Stephen Wilkes, American photographer
Steve Wilkes (born 1967), English professional footballer
T. M. Wilkes (1888–1958), Controller of Civil Aviation in New Zealand
Thomas Wilkes (MP) (by 1508–1536/37), English politician
Sir Thomas Wilkes (c.1545–1598), English civil servant and diplomat
Tom Wilkes (footballer) (1874–1921), English footballer
Tom Wilkes (1939–2009), American art director, designer, photographer, illustrator, writer and producer-director
Trudi Wilkes (born 1973), British voiceover artist
William Wilkes (1865–1940), English cricketer

Fictional characters
Annie Wilkes, fictional character in the Stephen King novel and film Misery
Ashley Wilkes, fictional character in American novel and film Gone with the Wind
Sergeant Wilkes, fictional character in the film, Dracula's Daughter

See also
Wilks
Wilke
Weelkes

English-language surnames
Surnames from given names